Sarodrano is a rural municipality in western Madagascar. It belongs to the Ambatomainty District, which is a part of Melaky Region. The population of the commune was estimated to be approximately 7,057 in 2018.

References 

Populated places in Melaky